Bayat is a village in Bor district of Niğde Province, Turkey. At  it is situated in theplains of Central Anatolia, to the south of Melendis Mountain. The population of Bayat is 425 as of 2011.

References 

Villages in Bor District, Niğde